Chitipat Tanklang (born August 11, 1991) is a Thai professional footballer who plays as a centre back for Thai League 1 club Buriram United.

International career

He represented Thailand U23 in the 2014 Asian Games.

Honours

Club
Buriram United
 Thai League 1: 2013, 2014, 2015, 2017, 2018
 Thai FA Cup: 2013, 2015
 Thai League Cup: 2013, 2015, 2016
 Thailand Champions Cup: 2019
 Toyota Premier Cup: 2014, 2016
 Kor Royal Cup: 2013, 2014, 2015, 2016
 Mekong Club Championship: 2015, 2016

References

External links
 Profile at Goal

1991 births
Living people
Chitipat Tanklang
Chitipat Tanklang
Association football defenders
Chitipat Tanklang
Chitipat Tanklang
Footballers at the 2014 Asian Games
Chitipat Tanklang